is a Japanese manga artist, known for her works like Peach Girl and Angel Wars. In 1999, she received the Kodansha Manga Award for shōjo for Peach Girl.

Miwa was born on September 29 in Hyōgo, Japan. She worked for some time with Sailor Moon author Naoko Takeuchi. She started publishing her works in 1985.

Works

Manga
Kyupi No pants wa nugasanaide - Kodansha
Kyou No watashi wa komatta Doll - Kodansha
G senjou No Maria (1989)- Kodansha
Jesus Christ! (1991) - Kodansha
Oh! My Darling (1992) - Kodansha
Imitation Gold (1994) - Kodansha
Angel Wars (1995) - Kodansha
Garasu no Kodou (1996) - Kodansha
Peach Girl (1998) - Kodansha
Peach Girl: Sae's Story (2005) - Kodansha
Papillon -hana to chou- (2007) - Kodansha ("Butterfly: Flower and Butterfly")
Pre Mari (2010) - Kodansha
Rokomoko (2011–12) - Kodansha
Peach Girl Next (2016–current) - Kodansha

Film adaptation
 Peach Girl (2017)

References

External links
 Official Peach Girl and Miwa Ueda site (Archived) 
 
 French Mangaverse Miwa Ueda profile

Japanese female comics artists
Female comics writers
Women manga artists
Living people
Manga artists from Hyōgo Prefecture
Winner of Kodansha Manga Award (Shōjo)
Japanese women writers
Year of birth missing (living people)